Claud Mintz, known professionally as Claud, is an American bedroom pop singer-songwriter from the suburbs of Chicago. Claud is non-binary and uses they/them pronouns. They are known for some of their songs "Soft Spot" and "Wish You Were Gay".

History
Claud began releasing music under the pseudonym Toast, releasing an EP in 2018. In 2019, they dropped out of college at Syracuse University to pursue music full-time. Claud released an EP called Sideline Star on October 25, 2019. In 2020, Claud formed a new band with Clairo, Josh Mehling, and Noa Frances Getzug, called Shelly. The group released two songs on October 30, 2020, titled "Steeeam" and "Natural". That same year, Claud became the first artist to sign on with Phoebe Bridgers' record label Saddest Factory Records. Claud's debut album, Super Monster, was released on February 12, 2021. In October 2021 Claud played with Bleachers at their Austin City Limits show. Their single "Soft Spot" was included on Vogue's list of "The 38 Best Songs of 2021."

Discography

Studio albums

Extended plays

Singles

Backing band

 Claud Mintz - lead vocals, guitar
 Molly Kirschenbaum - bass, guitar, backing vocals
 Francesca Impastato - drums, drum pad

References

Living people
Musicians from Chicago
Non-binary singers
Bedroom pop musicians
21st-century American LGBT people
1999 births
Dead Oceans artists